Sarah Louise Carroll (born 7 March 1995) is an Australian soccer player, who currently plays for Perth Glory in the Australian A-League Women. As part of the Australian team she won the silver medal at the 2013 AFF Women's Championship.

Playing career

Club

Perth Glory, 2011–present
Carroll made her debut for Perth Glory on 11 December 2011 in a match against Newcastle Jets. She made four appearances for the team during the 2011–12 W-League season. Perth finished in sixth place during the regular season with a  record. She returned to the squad for the 2012–13 W-League season and helped the team finish in second place during the regular season with a  record and secure a berth to the playoffs. Perth was defeated in a penalty kick shootout in the semifinal match against Melbourne Victory after a 1–1 draw during regular and overtime.

See also

References

Further reading
 Grainey, Timothy (2012), Beyond Bend It Like Beckham: The Global Phenomenon of Women's Soccer, University of Nebraska Press, 
 Stewart, Barbara (2012), Women's Soccer: The Passionate Game, Greystone Books,

External links
 Perth Glory player profile (archived)

1995 births
Living people
Australian women's soccer players
Perth Glory FC (A-League Women) players
Women's association football defenders
Women's association football midfielders